Dick Polman is a veteran national political columnist and the full-time "Writer in Residence" at the Center for Programs in Contemporary Writing, University of Pennsylvania. He has been on the full-time faculty since 2006. He currently writes about politics weekly at dickpolman.net and is nationally syndicated. He previously was a columnist at The Philadelphia Inquirer and WHYY News, the public media outlet in Philadelphia.

Polman grew up in western Massachusetts and studied at George Washington University, where he obtained a bachelor's degree in Public Affairs, focusing on politics and policy, and served as managing editor of the college newspaper. He was a metro columnist at The Hartford Courant and, prior to that, he was the founding editor of The Hartford Advocate before joining The Inquirer in 1984. As an Inquirer writer, he covered the 1992, 1996, 2000, 2004, and 2008 United States presidential campaigns. His Inquirer column ran from 2004 to 2012. His WHYY column ran from 2012 to 2019. He has been described by the Columbia Journalism Review as one of the United States' top political reporters, and by ABC News as "one of the finest political journalists of his generation."

References

Living people
American male journalists
George Washington University alumni
Year of birth missing (living people)